The Yangon City Heritage List is a list of man-made landmarks in Yangon, Myanmar, so designated by the city government, Yangon City Development Committee. The list consists of 188 structures (as of 2001), and is largely made up of mostly religious structures and British colonial-era buildings. The list is presented by the township in which the structures are located. In 2010, the Ministry of Culture further announced that 16 ancient pagodas in Yangon Division are recognized as cultural heritage sites, effective 10 February 2010. The Shwedagon Pagoda is recognized as both an Ancient Monument Zone and Protected and Preserved Zone. The other 15 are listed as Ancient Monument Zone.

Ahlon

Bahan

Botataung

Dagon

Hlaing

Insein

Kamayut

Kyauktada

Kyimyindaing

Lanmadaw

Latha

Mayangon

Mingala Taungnyunt

North Okkalapa

Pabedan

Pazundaung

Sanchaung

Tamwe

Thingangyun

Yankin

References

External links
 Yangon City Heritage list on Yangon City Development Committee

Yangon-related lists
Heritage registers in Myanmar
Lists of buildings and structures in Myanmar
Tourist attractions in Yangon
Heritage